Madhira is a municipality in Khammam district of the Indian state of Telangana. It is in Madhira mandal of Khammam division.

Geography 
It is surrounded by Andhra Pradesh state on three sides and Khammam district on one side.

Nearest Cities 

Khammam-55 km,
Vijayawada-77 km, 
Suryapet-96 km,
Rajamahendravaram-160 km,
Hyderabad-230 km.

References 

Census towns in Khammam district
Cities and towns in Khammam district